Breweries in Louisiana produce a wide range of beers in different styles that are marketed locally, regionally, and nationally. Brewing companies vary widely in the volume and variety of beer produced,  from small nanobreweries to microbreweries to massive multinational conglomerate macrobreweries.

In 2014, Louisiana's 37 breweries and brewpubs, and 66 distributors, and hundreds of retailers employed more than 15,000 people directly, and more than 10,000 others in related industries. Including people directly employed in brewing, as well as those who supply Louisiana's breweries with everything from ingredients to machinery, the total business and personal tax revenue generated by Louisiana's breweries and related industries was more than $380 million. Consumer purchases of Louisiana's brewery products generated more than $150 million in additional tax revenue. In 2014, according to the Brewers Association, Louisiana ranked 36th (out of 51 including Washington, D.C.) in the number of craft breweries per capita with 15.

For context, at the end of 2013 there were 2,822 breweries in the United States, including 2,768 craft breweries subdivided into 1,237 brewpubs, 1,412 microbreweries and 119 regional craft breweries.  In that same year, according to the Beer Institute, the brewing industry employed around 43,000 Americans in brewing and distribution and had a combined economic impact of more than $246 billion.

History

In the nineteenth and twentieth century, New Orleans was the hub of breweries in Louisiana. The first manufacturing establishment in the city of New Orleans was a brewery built by Pierre Dreux called La Brassiere in January 1723. In 1852, Louis and Samuel Fasnacht purchased property on Poeyfarre Street and started Fasnacht Brewery, which they sold to Erath and Company Brewery in 1869. The New Orleans Brewing Assoc. (1890) was founded out of a six brewery merger at the site of Louisiana Brewing Co. (1885). The brewery was located at Jackson Avenue and Tchoupitoulas Street and brands included 4-X Beer, Double Eagle Ale and Eagle Beer.

Jackson Brewing Co. opened in 1890 on Decatur Street, Regal beer made at the American Brewing Co. (1891) on Bienville Street, Columbia Brewing Co. (1899) on Elysian Fields Avenue, Dixie Brewing Co. (1907) on Tulane Avenue, National Brewing Co. (1911) on Gravier Street, Union Brewing Corp. (1911) on N. Robertson Street and Falstaff Brewing Corp. (1936) on Gravier Street.

The next chapter of brewing in Louisiana began in 1986 with the opening of the Abita Brewing Co. Following a nationwide trend of opening craft breweries like Abita, the beginning of the twenty-first century has seen craft breweries opening statewide.

Breweries

Closed breweries

See also
 Beer in the United States
 List of microbreweries
 List of cideries in the United States
 List of defunct breweries in the United States

References

External links

 Louisiana Brewery Trail

Louisiana
Breweries